Alexander Blockx (born 8 April 2005) is a Belgian tennis player. He has a career high junior tennis ranking of No. 3 in both singles and doubles, both achieved on 30 January 2023  after winning the 2023 Australian Open in the boys singles and reached the final in the 2023 boys doubles.

Professional Career

In October 2022, he made his ATP Tour main draw debut at the European Open in Antwerp, Belgium. 
In March 2023, he made his Masters 1000 qualifications debut after receiving a wildcard for the 2023 Miami Open where he lost to  Yosuke Watanuki.

Early life
Blockx is from Antwerp in Belgium. He has trained since childhood with Philippe Cassiers at his Forest Hills tennis academy in Belgium.

Career

2022
In 2022, Blockx reached the third round and then quarterfinals of the junior events at Wimbledon and the US Open, respectively. Shortly after the US Open, Blockx and sometime junior doubles partner Gilles-Arnaud Bailly were invited to train with the Belgium Davis Cup team by captain Johan Van Herck. Blockx was given a wildcard for the European Open qualifying, where he lost 6–4, 6–4, to Swiss Dominic Stricker. He was also given a wildcard into the main draw of the doubles, playing alongside Ruben Bemelmans in what proved to be Bemelmans' last professional game.

2023
Blockx reached the final at the 2023 Australian Open in both the boys' singles and, alongside Brazilian João Fonseca, the boys' doubles, which they lost to Learner Tien and Cooper Williams. Blockx gained revenge over Tien by winning the boys' singles final in three sets. Although Gilles-Arnaud Bailly reached two grand slam junior finals in 2022, the last Belgian male to win a junior grand slam, prior to Blocx, was Kimmer Coppejans at the 2012 French Open. No Belgian male had previously won the boys' singles in Melbourne.

ATP Challenger and ITF Futures finals

Singles: 1 (0–1)

Junior Grand Slam finals

Singles: 1 (1 title)

Doubles: 1 (1 runner-up)

References

External links

 
 

2005 births
Living people
Belgian male tennis players
Flemish sportspeople
Sportspeople from Antwerp
Grand Slam (tennis) champions in boys' singles
Australian Open (tennis) junior champions